Carl Frederick may refer to:
Carl Frederick, science fiction author
 Carl Frederick Tandberg (1910-1988), bass fiddle musician
 Carl Frederick Falkenberg
 Carl Frederick Fallen
 Carl Frederick Hempel, composer
Carl Frederick Mengeling, U.S. Catholic prelate

See also
 Karl Frederick, U.S. sport shooter
 Carl Friedrich (disambiguation)
 Frederick Carl (disambiguation)